Po Pin Chau is an island in Hong Kong. Off the eastern coast of the East Dam of the High Island Reservoir, the island is known for its hexagonal columnar jointing po po pooiong. The island was originally a cape connected to the mainland, but eventually broke away from the mainland due to years of erosion. The island is administered by the Sai Kung District.

Geology
The columnar rock formations on the island were formed after a series of volcanic eruptions in Hong Kong during the Jurassic Era.

Conservation
Po Pin Chau is part of the Hong Kong Geopark and Sai Kung East Country Park.

Po Pin Chau is part of the High Island Special Area, which covers 3.9 hectares and was designated in 2011. The area includes the two islands Po Pin Chau and Conic Island and no part of High Island proper. The geology of the area is characterised by volcanic rocks of the Cretaceous period.

References

Islands of Hong Kong
Sai Kung District
Uninhabited islands of Hong Kong